Ieiri (written: 家入) is a Japanese surname. Notable people with the surname include:

, Japanese internet entrepreneur
, Japanese singer-songwriter

Japanese-language surnames